Michael Anthony January (born June 30, 1964) is a former American football linebacker who played three games for the Chicago Bears of the National Football League in 1987. He played college football at University of Texas at Austin.

References 

Living people
1964 births
American football linebackers
Texas Longhorns football players
Chicago Bears players